Rhabdotosperma is a genus of flowering plants in the family Scrophulariaceae.

It contains the following species:

Rhabdotosperma bottae 
Rhabdotosperma brevipedicellata 
Rhabdotosperma densifolia 
Rhabdotosperma ledermannii 
Rhabdotosperma scrophulariifolia

References

 
Scrophulariaceae genera
Taxonomy articles created by Polbot